John McDonald was a player in the National Football League. He was a member of the Evansville Crimson Giants and the Louisville Colonels.

References

Evansville Crimson Giants players
Louisville Colonels (NFL) players
Lawrence Vikings football players
1900 births
Year of death missing